Victor Franzoni (Born October 5, 1995 in Sao Paulo, Brazil) is a Brazilian racing driver. Franzoni raced various European racing series before competing the American USF2000 series.

Career
After karting Franzoni made his auto racing debut in the Brazilian Formula Future Fiat in 2011. Franzoni won races at Interlagos and Curitiba. A strong end of the season, with four consecutive podium finishes, placed Franzoni fourth in the series standings. In August 2011 Franzoni made his European racing debut at Circuit de Spa-Francorchamps. In the 2011 Formula Abarth season the Brazilian joined Cram Competition with a best finish at of ninth.

In 2012 Franzoni started the season in the Formula 3 Brazil Open. Racing in Class B, for older cars, Franzoni crashed out of the final race. For the regular season Franzoni joined Koiranen Motorsport for the 2012 Formula Renault 2.0 Alps Series. With two fourth places at the Red Bull Ring as his best result, Franzoni ended eleventh in the final standings. For 2013 Franzoni remained at Koiranen for their 2013 Eurocup Formula Renault 2.0 campaign. Struggling midfield Franzoni scored two point finishes. In January 2014 Franzoni raced at Interlagos to compete in the 2014 Formula 3 Brazil Open. With a retirement in the pre-final Franzoni was condemned to start the final race in seventh place. After a strong race Franzoni finished second, behind Felipe Guimarães.

The 2014 regular season marked his debut in the American USF2000 series. At Afterburner Autosport Franzoni won his debut race in the streets of St. Petersburg. Collecting a total of four podium finishes, including his oval racing debut at Lucas Oil Raceway, Franzoni ended fifth in the season standings. The following season Franzoni remained at Afterburner for the first six races of the season. Franzoni won one of the races at NOLA Motorsports Park before moving up into the Pro Mazda Championship, scoring another three top five finishes. Moving back into USF2000 Franzoni joined ArmsUp Motorsports. Franzoni won three races, at Toronto, and two at Laguna Seca. With another eight podium finishes Franzoni secured the third place in the championship.

Complete motorsports results

American Open-Wheel racing results
(key) (Races in bold indicate pole position, races in italics indicate fastest race lap)

USF2000 National Championship

Pro Mazda Championship

Indy Lights

Complete WeatherTech SportsCar Championship results
(key) (Races in bold indicate pole position; results in italics indicate fastest lap)

References

1995 births
Living people
U.S. F2000 National Championship drivers
Formula Renault 2.0 Alps drivers
Formula Abarth drivers
Indy Pro 2000 Championship drivers
Indy Lights drivers
24 Hours of Daytona drivers
Brazilian WeatherTech SportsCar Championship drivers
Súper TC 2000 drivers
Racing drivers from São Paulo
Juncos Hollinger Racing drivers
Brazilian Formula Three Championship drivers
Koiranen GP drivers
Newman Wachs Racing drivers
Formula Regional Americas Championship drivers
Cram Competition drivers
Hitech Grand Prix drivers
Lamborghini Super Trofeo drivers